Rootz: The Green City Music Festival is a folk music festival sponsored by Calliope: Pittsburgh Folk Music Society in Pittsburgh, Pennsylvania.  The first annual Green City Music Festival was held in Mellon Park near Shadyside on Saturday, July 12, 2008, and featured performances by Rani Arbo and Daisy Mayhem, Steve Forbert, Ernie Hawkins and his band, and many other performances by various local and regional musicians.

In 1977, Calliope held its first outdoor music festival, The Smoky City Folk Festival. The SCFF was held for the next 23 years and created the opportunity for local artists to perform in front of thousands of people.  The 2008 Green City Music Festival was an updated version of the Smoky City Folk Festival.  The name change reflects the city of Pittsburgh's efforts to clean itself up over the years and shed its smoky past while still celebrating the people who helped make it what it is today.

2020 will see no festival caused by the COVID-19 pandemic; the 13th was deferred to 2021.

References

External links
Official Calliope Website

Festivals in Pittsburgh
Folk festivals in the United States
Music of Pittsburgh
Music festivals established in 2008
Music festivals in Pennsylvania
2008 establishments in Pennsylvania